PTV GmbH (Planung Transport Verkehr) is a German company specializing in software and consulting services for traffic and transportation, mobility, and logistics. "Vision Traffic Suite," their transport planning software, and "PTV Map & Guide," their program for route planning, comprise the PTV AG's product portfolio. According to the manufacturer; over 2,000 customers in more than 90 countries use the Vision Traffic Suite in the fields of transport modelling and traffic flow calculation. PTV ranks among the top 1,000 global market leaders in Germany according to Germany's Manager Magazine. The German company PTV Planung Transport Verkehr GmbH is a member of PTV Group.

History
In 1979 Dr.-Ing. Hans Hubschneider and Michael Sahling founded PTV Planungsbüro Transport und Verkehr GmbH in Karlsruhe, Germany. Between 1979 and 1982 they developed the first computer program for trip planning. The first projects included location and distribution planning for Raiffeisen in Schleswig-Holstein, line network planning for bus and road transport in Mannheim and trip planning for Langnese-Iglo. These projects were the basis for the development of other software products.
In 1999, PTV's five GmbH units were merged into PTV Planung Transport Verkehrs AG (the "AG" stands for Aktiengesellschaft, which is a corporation under German law). Since 2001, the company has been providing software products and services in the fields of transport, mobility, and logistics. In 2012, PTV launches a new corporate design and a new logo: The PTV Group. In 2016 PTV Group has acquired 100% of the British company Distributed Planning Software Limited (DPS). In June 2017, the Porsche Automobil Holding SE (Porsche SE) announced the acquisition of PTV, for a purchase price in excess of 300 million euro. he international Private Equity Investor Bridgepoint acquired a majority stake in PTV in October 2021. Porsche Automobil Holding SE retains a 40 percent stake in the company (https://company.ptvgroup.com/en/resources/newsroom/latest-news/bridgepoint-acquires-a-majority-stake-in-ptv-group). In February 2022 PTV Planung Transport Verkehr AG changed its legal form to a limited liability company and now operates under the name PTV Planung Transport Verkehr GmbH.

In October 2007, the joint-stock company was awarded the negative Big Brother Award in the “Technology” category “for its system for the individual calculation of car insurance” with the pay-as-you-drive system because it “records the route and driving behavior and sent to the insurance company". The following year, PTV accepted the award.

Business & Markets
Today, PTV has a global network of offices and partners on five continents. Currently, the PTV Group employs more than 900 people and has subsidiaries in Berlin, Dresden, Düsseldorf, Erfurt, and Stuttgart. Moreover, it operates a wide network of subsidiaries and associated companies that are located in France, Belgium, the Netherlands, Italy, the UK, Poland, Spain and Austria, and in countries outside of Europe, such as Dubai, China, the United States, Australia, Canada, Mexico and Africa. PTV focuses on the following industry sectors: automotive industry, ICT sector, transport and logistics, government, traffic and transportation, mobility, traffic engineering, food and healthcare, and furniture. The company offers solutions, data, consulting and research for topics like urban logistics, MaaS, autonomous driving, or sharing economy.

Organization
PTV is divided into three business fields: 
Traffic Software (transportation planning, transport models, traffic simulation, public transport)
Transport Consulting (transport planning and traffic engineering, traffic management, public transport, integrated transport concepts for sustainable mobility)
Logistics Software (planning and optimization of transports and sales structures, software for route and trip planning, geomanagement, geomarketing, visualization on digital maps).

Products
Traffic Software (PTV Vision):
 PTV Visum macroscopic travel-demand modelling)
 PTV Vissim (microscopic traffic simulation)
 PTV Viswalk (microscopic pedestrian simulation)
 PTV Vistro (traffic engineering)
 PTV Optima (real-time traffic management)
 PTV Balance (traffic-adaptive network control)
 PTV Epics (traffic-adaptive signal control)
 PTV Vistad (qualitative collection and validation of accident data
 PTV Mobility as a Service (MaaS) Accelerator Program (component technologies for MaaS operations)

The software is used by engineering offices, public authorities, and research institutes as well as by students in transportation engineering.

Logistics Software:
 PTV Map&Guide (route planner with emissions calculation)
 PTV Smartour (professional trip planning program for transport companies)
 PTV Map&Market (software for the optimisation of sales operations)
 PTV xServer (geographical and logistical software components)
 PTV Navigator (navigation for truck fleets)
 PTV Route Optimiser (strategic transport planning and daily route scheduling)
 PTV Drive&Arrive (cloud-based service informing about ETA of transports in real-time)

Projects
PTV is involved in the development of systems for traffic management, traffic information and forecasts. This includes, for example, the European transport model, which encompasses all passenger transport and freight movements in Europe, and is developed using PTV software, as well as traveler information services on the BayernInfo.de website of the German state of Bavaria.

Since 2008, PTV supports "DAS FEST", an open-air festival in Karlsruhe, by simulating pedestrian escape routes. The information film was based on the software module PTV Vissim which allows the user to model and visualise the interaction between people at major events and between people and vehicles. Another application simulated the transfer behaviour of passengers at the North Melbourne Station in Australia.

Research

2015 PTV was coordinating the project BESTFACT with the aim to collect, develop, and publicise best practices and innovations in the field of freight transport and thus allow a broad use of this information.

The aim of the project Modulushca, also coordinated by PTV, was to create a closer pan-European network for the logistics industry in close cooperation with its North American partners and the international Physical Internet Initiative.

PTV is involved in the iHub project, which has the aim to develop and use one platform that ensures efficient vehicle operations and vehicle fleet management.

PTV is involved in the European FLOW project that focuses on urban road transport, analysing the role of pedestrians and cyclists. The core of PTV's contribution corresponds to the improvement of the existing transport simulation software (PTV Visum, PTV Vissim and PTV Viswalk), as well as the development of a socio-economic impact assessment to better analyse the impacts of walking and cycling measures on the road transport network performance, and thereby on congestion.

At IAA Commercial Vehicles 2010 in Hanover, Germany, PTV presented the results of the study on intelligent cargo systems. The research study was carried out on behalf of the European Commission and focused on intelligent freight transport. It presents scenarios in 2020 and 2035 and analyses the increasing demand for efficient and sustainable logistics and the complex planning tasks for global transport chains covering all modes of transport.

Since 2008, PTV has been involved in research projects focusing on the sustainable development of megacities, such as "Climate and Energy in a Complex Transition Process
towards Sustainable Hyderabad". The aim is to develop urban-planning concepts until 2013. These concepts will then be used as the basis for decision-making processes concerning future transport systems and traffic infrastructure.

A new routing method for urban transport has been developed by PTV as part of the CVIS project which is funded by the European Commission. Route recommendations provided by cities and communities can also be included in this strategic routing method, which was presented to the public with live driving demonstrations in November 2009.

In cooperation with its 28 project partners, PTV is involved in the research initiative AKTIV (i.e., "Adaptive and Cooperative Technologies for Intelligent Traffic"), whose aim is to make future traffic and transportation safer and more efficient. To this end, new driver assistance systems, information technologies, and software for efficient traffic management will be developed by the project team. As part of AKTIV, PTV has created a network which allows communication between the traffic management system, the car, and the road infrastructure.

In 2009 PTV used its transportation planning software PTV Vision for the simulation of the traffic flow to and from Yas Marina Circuit, the Formula One track in Abu Dhabi. This simulation included all modes of transport in a single model and it was also possible to model the behaviour of the Formula One fans at the grandstands

The European Union therefore initiated the research project eCoMove in spring 2010. A consortium of 32 partners will test the energy efficiency of cooperative systems and services until March 2013. PTV AG is also a member of the ecoMove consortium and is involved in three of the six sub-projects, focussing on car-to-x-communication, cooperative, eco-friendly traffic management & control, and ecoFreight & Logistics.

PTV is consortium partner of the research project for urban and autonomous freight logistics, efeuCampus in Bruchsal, funded by the European Union and the state Baden-Württemberg. PTV is responsible for the transport processes on the site and the route planning of the autonomous vehicles within the general conditions.

References

Software companies of Germany
Companies based in Baden-Württemberg
Companies based in Karlsruhe